The New Jersey–Albania National Guard Partnership is one of 25 European partnerships that make up the U.S. European Command State Partnership Program and one of 88 worldwide partnerships that make-up the National Guard State Partnership Program. The partnership was established in 1993. The current M2M focus places emphasis on OCO support, NCO Development, Military Medical pre/post deployment medical care, Military Police mentoring, military support to civil authority and disaster response.

History

 NATO accession in 2009
 2010 Visa Liberalization allowed Albanians to travel throughout the EU
 The latter part of 2010, conscription ended changing the nature of the AAF, with ramifications for training and development of the Force
 Albania to get EU candidate status provided it delivers key reforms in the judiciary, public administration and the functioning of parliament.
 Political instability- supporters of the Prime Minister Sali Berisha and opposition leader Edi Rama (Mayor of Tirana) have faced off in the past
 U.S. Ambassador to Albania warns of rise in nationalist rhetoric during elections
 More Parliamentary elections set for June 23, 2013
 Unexploded Ordnance program is a huge success (13 tons annually) and remains a priority for the US Embassy

Partnership focus

Over 100 NJNG to AAF events have been conducted since the partnership began with an emphasis in NCO /Officer Corps Development, Logistics, Medical and MP. The focus for 2013-2015 is a continued expansion of the NCO / Officer Corps professionalism and the expansion of Response to Natural and Man-made Disasters, and IG development. The partnership has assisted in the Preparation of multiple AAF teams for deployment, to include: OMLT/MAT 1-4, MP, medical and EAGLE teams.

Focus of Military-to-Military events:
 Develop SPP to play larger role in ODC’s programs
 Expand to regional events – Adriatic 5 country exercises
 Focus NJ units inclusion as partner on ODT opportunities

2013 Planned Events:
 Human Resource Development
 Operational Logistics Capabilities
 Civil Support Team Capabilities
 Disaster Response planning and Capabilities
 Officer Commissioning Program
 Senior Leader Interagency Engagements
 Pre-Deployment Capabilities
 Material Management
 Military Police Deployed Operations
 Wild Land Fire Management

References

External links
The EUCOM State Partnership page for New Jersey-Albania
jersey+albania Department of Defense News on the New Jersey-Albania Partnership
EUCOM SPP
National Guard Bureau SPP
National Guard Bureau SPP News Archives

Albania–United States military relations
Military alliances involving the United States
New Jersey National Guard